Lillian Dube (born 30 September 1945) is a South African actress.  She is perhaps best known for portraying Masebobe in the soap opera Generations.

Personal life
In 2007, Dube was diagnosed with breast cancer and has been in remission as of 2008.  The cancer returned again in 2015.

Awards and nominations
In 2017, Dube was awarded an honorary doctorate in Drama and Film Production at the Tshwane University of Technology.

Select filmography
Mapantsula (1988)
Sweet 'n Short (1991)
There's a Zulu On My Stoep (1993)
A Good Man in Africa (1994)
Cry, the Beloved Country (1995)
In My Country (2004)
Oh Schuks... I'm Gatvol (2004)
Cape of Good Hope (2004)
Fanie Fourie's Lobola (2013)
The Forgotten Kingdom (2013)
 Nothing for Mahala (2013)
Mia and the White Lion (2018)
''GoGo Helen'x

References

External links
 

Living people
1945 births
21st-century South African actresses
South African film actresses
South African television actresses
20th-century South African actresses